Jan Andrlík (born 17 May 1977 in Prague) is a Czech sprint canoeist who competed in the early 2000s. At the 2000 Summer Olympics in Sydney, he was disqualified in the semifinals of the K-2 1000 m event.

References
 Sports-Reference.com profile

External links
 

1977 births
Canoeists at the 2000 Summer Olympics
Czech male canoeists
Living people
Olympic canoeists of the Czech Republic
Canoeists from Prague